Kolkata Knight Riders (KKR) is a franchise cricket team based in Kolkata, India, which plays in the Indian Premier League (IPL). They were one of the eight teams that competed in the 2014 Indian Premier League. They were captained by Gautam Gambhir. Kolkata Knight Riders finished winners in the IPL and qualified for the Champions League T20.

Background 
Knight Riders retained only their captain Gambhir and spinner Sunil Narine as they went into the 2014 IPL auctions. They bought back Jacques Kallis, Yusuf Pathan, Shakib Al Hasan, Manvinder Bisla and Ryan Ten Doeschate. New additions to the side were Robin Uthappa, Manish Pandey, Suryakumar Yadav, Morne Morkel, Umesh Yadav, Piyush Chawla, Vinay Kumar, Chris Lynn along with some other uncapped and foreign players. KKR had a good start to the seventh edition in UAE, defeating defending champions Mumbai Indians in the inaugural match. However, their performance dipped and they won only 1 out of their next 4 games played there, including a super over tie against Rajasthan Royals, which they ultimately lost on a boundary count. Their poor form continued as they lost two more matches after they were back in India, making it five losses in seven games. The team changed their batting order, promoting Robin Uthappa as an opener which worked very well as he became the highest run scorer in the tournament with 660 runs. He also scored 40+ runs in 10 consecutive matches. Sunil Narine continued his great run, being the second highest wicket taker. Knight Riders recovered from the losing streak, winning each of their next 7 games. In their last group game against the Sunrisers Hyderabad, Yusuf Pathan blitzed his way to a half century off just 15 balls, which is a record in the IPL. After the group stage, they were tied at 18 points with Chennai Super Kings but beat them to the second place in points table by a better net run rate.

They played the first Qualifier at their home ground Eden Gardens against Kings XI Punjab which they won by 28 runs and entered the final for the second time in their history. In the final at Bengaluru, they met Kings XI Punjab again and defeated them by 3 wickets in a thrilling match chasing a mammoth 200, with local boy Manish Pandey delivering his best knock of the season with a brilliant 94 in 50  balls, to win their second title in 3 years. The victory was celebrated grandly in a similar fashion to their 2012 Indian Premier League title win.

Indian Premier League

Season standings
Kolkata Knight Riders finished winners in the league stage of IPL 2014.

Match log

Champions League Twenty20

Match log

References

2014 Indian Premier League
Kolkata Knight Riders seasons